Jukkas River is a river of Sweden. It is a tributary of the Tärendö River.

See also
Jukkasjärvi

Rivers of Norrbotten County